Kalman Varga is a Hungarian-American physicist, currently at Vanderbilt University. He researches computational nanoscience, focusing on developing novel computational methods for electronic structure calculations. He is an Elected Fellow of the American Physical Society. He was accredited to co-writing Computational Nanoscience: Applications for Molecules, Clusters, and Solids in 2011, as well as  Structure and Reactions of Light Exotic Nuclei (2003), and Stochastic Variational Approach to Quantum-Mechanical Few-Body Problems (1998).

References

Living people
Fellows of the American Physical Society
21st-century American physicists
21st-century Hungarian physicists
1963 births